The 1927 Louisville Cardinals football team was an American football team that represented the University of Louisville as a member of the Kentucky Intercollegiate Athletic Conference (KIAC) during the 1927 college football season. In their third season under head coach Tom King, the Cardinals compiled a 4–4 record.

Schedule

References

Louisville
Louisville Cardinals football seasons
Louisville Cardinals football